Encore heureux is a 2015 French drama film written and directed by Benoît Graffin.

Cast 
 Sandrine Kiberlain as Marie Ogiel
 Édouard Baer as Sam Ogiel
 Benjamin Biolay as Antoine
 Carla Besnaïnou as Alexia Ogiel
 Mathieu Torloting as Clément Ogiel
 Guilaine Londez as Madame Martin
 Bulle Ogier as Louise
 Anna Gaylor as Madeleine
 Florence Viala as Cathy
 Hindiya Elkassmi as Chloé

References

External links
 

2015 films
2015 drama films
2010s French-language films
French drama films
Films directed by Benoît Graffin
EuropaCorp films
2010s French films